WKVX is an AM radio station in Wooster, Ohio, United States, broadcasting at 960 kHz with a classic hits format. it is co-owned with FM station WQKT.  Programming comes from Westwood One's Classic Hits/Pop network (formerly Kool Gold).

The station began broadcasting on September 17, 1947 as WWST, originally broadcasting daytime only. It changed to WKVX on September 1, 1988.

Previous logo
  (WKVX's logo under previous "Oldies 960" branding)

External links
WQKT - WKVX Facebook

KVX
Classic hits radio stations in the United States
Radio stations established in 1947
1947 establishments in Ohio